Taihu stone or porous stone is a kind of limestone produced at the foot of Dongting Mountain in Suzhou, which is close to Lake Tai. Due to long-term surging by water, this kind of stone features pores and holes.

These stones are very popular in gardening, following the concepts of traditional daoism and juxtaposition, themes very popular in that style of decoration.

See also
Gongshi

References

Culture in Suzhou
Limestone